Life and Death of a Spanish Town is a book by Elliot Paul based on his actual experiences of living in the town of Santa Eulària des Riu on the Spanish island of Ibiza, at the outbreak of the Spanish Civil War.
The book was published in 1937 by Random House Inc, of New York.

Format
The book starts with a list of the Men and Women of Santa Eulalia. The story is then presented in two parts. The first is titled 4000 BC to 1936 AD, with the second part called July 14 to September 15, 1936. There is also a postscript by Paul, dated 14 June 1937.

Synopsis
The book is set in and around the small town of Santa Eulària des Riu, on Ibiza, where Paul had lived since 1931. In the first part of the book Elliot Paul describes the town and many of the characters who live and work there. He details their family lives, their hopes, their aspirations, and their politics. He provides details of the people at work and at play, and describes how he becomes part of the community of the town. Paul also writes of other ex-patriates who have made their homes in and around the town. Part two starts with Paul and his family returning to Ibiza, after some time away. The narrative is set in 1936 in the week leading up to the outbreak of hostilities on Ibiza during the Spanish Civil War and describes the events that eventually lead to Paul, his family and other refugees from the violence, fleeing the island. It tells the story of civil disobedience, collaboration and the violence that split a once-happy community, although the narrative finishes before the tragic turn of events reaches its conclusion. The postscript, written  by Paul, dated 14 June 1937, details events following his departure from Ibiza and describes his hopes and fears for his friends on the island and a way of life that he thought would change for ever.

Contents

The Characters

The Fishermen and their Families

 Captain Juan
 Mateo Rosa, His Wife Paja, their daughter Maria
 Edmundo, Mateo’s brother
 Toniet Pardal, his wife and children

Hotel and Café keepers

 Cosmi, his wife Anna
 Antonio the cook, Cosmi’s brother
 Catalina, servant in Cosmi’s hotel
 Juanito, young proprietor of the Royalty
 Pedro, the waiter at the Royalty
 Xumeu Ribas, proprietor of Can Xumeu and custodian of the public telephone, his wife and daughter
 Francisco Ribas, Xumeu’s son
 Antonia, proprietress of the fisherman’s bar
 Julia her daughter
 Andres, of Can Andres

Storekeepers

 Old Jaun, of the Casa Rosita, his on Mariano, his daughter-in-law Vicenta
 Toni Ferrer, of Las Delicias
 Miguel Tur, of the Casa Miguel
 Guarapiñada, of Tot Barat
 Mousson, the butcher, his daughter Catalina, his blind aunt

Artisans and Mechanics

 Guillermo, the blacksmith
 Sindik, the carpenter
 Jaun Sindik, his son
 Jaume, the carpenter
 Primitivo, the electrician
 Bonéd, Fascist mason
 Vicente Cruz, younge republican mason
 Ramon, the bus driver

The Priest

 Old Father Coll
 Father Torres
 Father Margall, and assisting on holidays, Father Clapés and the priest who looked like a butcher boy
 The San Carlos priest and his father

Officials and Guardias

 Mayor Serra, Republican
 The Fascist Mayor
 The Secretario
 Anfita, the postmaster, his two idiot sons, Pepe and Chicul
 Sergeant Gomez, of the Guardia Civil
 Guardias Ferrer, Jiminez and Bravo
 The Portero
 Ex-Captain Nicolau, retired army officer
 Fernando, a schoolmaster
 Carlos, his cousin, also a schoolmaster

Farmers and Landowners

 Pep Salvador, Cosmi’s brother
 Pere des Puig
 José and Catalina, of Can Josepi
 Francisco Guasch
 José Ribas, the diving champion
 Don Ignacio Riquer
 Don Carlos Roman
 Don Rafael Sainz, vacationing banking millionaire
 Pep des Horts (Algot Lange), the Dane

The Banker

 Don Abel Matutes

Artists

 Andres, the young socialist
 Rigoberto Soler
 Derek Rogers, English painter

Woman and Young Girls

 Eulalia Noguera
 Marie Anfita, the postmans daughter
 Teresa Bonéd, her daughter Juana
 Maruja, the Secretario’s daughter
 Odila, Ex-Captain Nicolaus daughter
 Angeles, granddaughter of old Vicent the mason
 Maria, Pep Salvador’s favourite daughter
 Marguerita, fiancée of Fernando the schoolmaster

Military Officers and Militiamen

 Captain Don Alfredo Bayo, leader of government expedition
 Captain Pastor, second in command
 El Cubano, a corporal
 Maño, a militiaman
 Pedro, Maño comrade
 Ex-Commandant Mestres, rebel Governor of the island

Part 1

4000 BC to 1936 AD

 I. Dawn and Moonlight
 II. Of Fish and Fishermen
 III. The Morning Bus
 IV. Stores and Storekeepers
 V. The Church
 VI. Cosmi and the Punta de Arabie
 VII. Of Farms and Farmers
 VIII. A Group in the Main Street
 IX. The Back Street
 X. Of Public Service
 XI. Les Jeunes Filles en Fleur
 XII. The Guardia Civil
 XIII. Communists, Fascists, and Others

Part 2

July 14 to September 15, 1936

 XIV. The Barcelona Boat
 XV. An Airplane
 XVI. The Manifesto
 XVII. The Fleet
 XVIII. The Man Hunt
 XIX. The Bombardment
 XX. Victory
 XXI. The Internationale
 XXII. Dios Foutut
 XXIII. La Lutte Finale
 XXIV. Maño
 XXV. Shadows of Vultures
 Postscript

Reviews
The book was praised by Richard Rees, editor of The Adelphi magazine, who called it, along with George Orwell's Homage to Catalonia and Georges Bernanos's  Les grands cimetières sous la lune, one of "the only books about Spain that can be said to be written by people with free (i.e. fundamentally honest, if often mistaken ) minds".

References

1937 books
Santa Eulària des Riu
Novels set during the Spanish Civil War
Books and novels about Ibiza
Random House books